Kenneth Edward Price (25 March 1939 – May 2014) was an English footballer who played as a centre forward in the Football League for Tranmere Rovers and Hartlepools United.

References

1939 births
2014 deaths
People from Ellesmere Port
Association football forwards
English footballers
Aston Villa F.C. players
Tranmere Rovers F.C. players
Hartlepool United F.C. players
Spalding United F.C. players
English Football League players